Simply may refer to:

 Simply (Blossom Dearie album), 1982
 Simply (K. T. Oslin album), 2015
 "Simply", a song by De La Soul from the 2001 album AOI: Bionix
 Simply Market, a French supermarket chain
 Simply Beverages, an American fruit juice company

See also

Simple (disambiguation)